John Nutting (born in Margate, England) is an Australian radio presenter.

Nutting was host of country music show Saturday Night Country on ABC Local Radio across Australia for 17 years between 1993 and 2010.

In 2010, Nutting announced he was retiring from radio and was replaced by Felicity Urquhart on Saturday Night Country from the end of February 2010.

In 2013, Nutting returned to radio as host of Saturday Breakfast on ABC North Queensland in Townsville. He continued in this role until October 2015.

In January 2016, Nutting commenced work with Australian Country Radio programming and presenting country music, the Australian Country Radio website and associated streaming platforms.

In 2015, Nutting was critical of the ABC's decision to reduce local programming at regional ABC stations such as ABC North Queensland in 2016, suggesting the ABC might as well broadcast local programming for Townsville listeners from Wagga Wagga, New South Wales.

References

Living people
People from Margate
People from Queensland
Australian radio presenters
Australian radio personalities
21st-century American politicians
Year of birth missing (living people)